Omkar Goswami is an Indian economist and business journalist for Business India. He is the founders and chairperson of Corporate and Economic Research Group Advisory Private Limited (CERG).

Early life and education

Goswami did his B.A. from St. Xavier's College, Calcutta, Calcutta University. Omkar Goswami holds a Master's in Economics from the Delhi School of Economics, Delhi University in 1978; and in 1982 he received the doctor of philosophy  in Economics from Oxford University for the thesis: "The jute economy of Bengal, 1900-1947: unequal interaction between the industrial, trading and agricultural sectors" under supervision of Tapan Raychaudhuri, the eminent Indian historian.

His daughter, Shahana Goswami, is a film and television actress.

Career
Returning from Oxford he worked most notably with Lovraj Kumar in the Government of India and had various academic associations. In March 1997 he became Editor of Business India, magazine.

Dr. Goswami serves as a Director on the boards of Forbes, Dr. Reddy's Laboratories, DSP Merrill Lynch Fund Managers Limited, Infrastructure Development and Finance Company Limited, Crompton Greaves, Sona Koyo Steering Systems Limited, Ambuja Cements Limited, Cairn India Limited, Infosys and Bajaj Finserv.

He is the Founder and Chairman of CERG Advisory Private Limited (CERG -Corporate and Economic Research Group) 

He has held the position of Chief Economist with the Indian business association Confederation of Indian Industry from August 1998 up to March 2004.

Works
 The Jute Economy of Bengal 1900-1947: a study of interaction between the industrial, trading and agricultural sectors. University of Oxford Faculty of Modern History. Published by University of Oxford, 1982.
 Electronics in India, 1985-86 to 1989-90: Targets and Policies : a Report. Published by Association of Indian Engineering Industry, 1984.
 Industry, Trade, and Peasant Society: The Jute Economy of Eastern India, 1900-1947. Oxford University Press, 1991. .
 Policy reform in India, by Isher Judge Ahluwalia, Rakesh Mohan, Omkar Goswami, Charles Oman. Published by Development Centre, Organisation for Economic Co-operation and Development, 1996.
 Corporate bankruptcy in India: a comparative perspective. Published by OCDE.
 Goras and Desis: Managing Agencies and the Making of Corporate India, by Omkar Goswami, with an introduction by Gurcharan Das. Published by Penguin Random House India, 2016.

Further reading
 Omkar Goswami articles at Business World
 Omkar Goswami articles at Outlook

References
https://www.outlookindia.com/newsscroll/cg-power-mails-show-deliberate-attempt-to-deny-thapar-info/1679626

External links
 Omkar Goswami profile at BusinessWeek
 Dr. Omkar Goswami Profile Hindustan Times

 https://m.economictimes.com/industry/energy/power/cg-power-mails-show-deliberate-attempt-to-deny-thapar-info/articleshow/72405791.cms

20th-century Indian economists
Indian male journalists
Living people
University of Calcutta alumni
Delhi School of Economics alumni
Harvard University staff
Tufts University faculty
Rutgers University faculty
Indian business and financial journalists
Alumni of the University of Oxford
Academic staff of Jawaharlal Nehru University
Delhi University alumni
Year of birth missing (living people)